Michael Kelley (born 1967, Chicago, Illinois) is an American television writer and producer and creator of television series What/If, Revenge and Swingtown.

Early life
Kelley was born in Chicago, growing up and attending school at New Trier High School in Winnetka, Illinois until 1985. A classmate of his was musician Liz Phair, who he would later bring to the television scoring business.

Career
Kelley has written and produced on shows including The O.C. and Providence. He co-wrote episodes of Providence with Jennifer M. Johnson. He is creator of the TV series Swingtown, and has also written episodes for the show, which began airing on CBS in 2008.

Kelley created and wrote ABC's Revenge, a contemporary re-imagining of Alexandre Dumas' The Count of Monte Cristo from a female perspective.

In August 2018, it was announced that Kelley will be credited as an executive producer, writer and creator for the Netflix anthology thriller miniseries, What/If. The series premiered on May 24, 2019.

References

External links

Television producers from Illinois
American television writers
American male television writers
Living people
1967 births
New Trier High School alumni
Screenwriters from Illinois